Mendiola Street (simply known as "Mendiola") is a short thoroughfare in Manila, Philippines. The street is named after Enrique Mendiola, an educator, textbook author, and member of the first Board of Regents of the University of the Philippines. As a street close to Malacañang Palace, the President of the Philippines' official residence, it has been the site of numerous and sometimes bloody demonstrations.

On the north end of the street is the Don Chino Roces Bridge, named in honor of Chino Roces, a well-known figure during the Philippines' Martial Law years. (An illuminated street sign above the intersection of Recto and Mendiola erroneously refers to the latter street as Chino Roces Avenue).

Mendiola Street starts at the intersection of Legarda Street and Claro M. Recto Avenue and ends at Jose Laurel Street, just outside Malacañang Palace. Four colleges and universities which form a part of the University Belt are on Mendiola Street. 

To protect Malacañang Palace, the part of Mendiola Street that starts at the sentinel gate in front of the College of the Holy Spirit and La Consolacion College Manila is closed to vehicles. Vehicles are diverted to Concepcion Aguila Street, a narrow side street that passes through residential areas of San Miguel district.

Protests

Mendiola Street has frequently been the site of often violent confrontations between protesters and government troops protecting Malacañang Palace:

1970
During the administration of Ferdinand Marcos, Mendiola Street was the site of the "Battle of Malacañang" or "The Battle of Mendiola Bridge", a confrontation between student demonstrators and police forces that occurred on January 30, 1970. The confrontation resulted in the deaths of four student demonstrators.

1987

On January 22, 1987, crowd control troops opened fire on a protest rally of about 10,000 peasant farmers demanding "genuine" land reform from then-President Corazon Aquino. Thirteen of the protesters were killed and hundreds were injured in the incident now known as the Mendiola massacre.

2001
On May 1, 2001, supporters of former President Joseph Estrada, angered by his arrest following his ouster from power earlier that year, marched to Mendiola Street after staging demonstrations outside the EDSA Shrine. They demanded the release and reinstate of Estrada. A violent confrontation ensued between Estrada's supporters and members of the Philippine National Police and the Armed Forces of the Philippines, who were then tasked by the then-President, Gloria Macapagal Arroyo, to secure Malacañang Palace and the areas surrounding it. Mendiola Street and the vicinity around Malacañang Palace became a front line after the protesters tried to storm the Palace. Casualties were high on both the Estrada supporters' and government troops' end. As a result of the looting of stores and shops and the burning of several government and private vehicles by the protesters, damage to and loss of property along Mendiola Street and areas within the vicinity of Malacañang Palace was estimated to in millions of pesos. President Gloria Macapagal Arroyo declared a state of rebellion to stifle the rioting; it was lifted after two days.

References

External links

GMANews.TV, Protest marks 21st anniversary of Mendiola Massacre - January 21, 2008
gmanews.tv/video, Saksi: Mendiola Massacre anniversary march comes off peaceful, January 23, 2008 (in Filipino)

Streets in Manila
San Miguel, Manila